Bo Daniel Theorin (born 4 August 1983) is a retired Swedish footballer, who played as a defender.

He had a -year-long successful stint in Gefle IF, but left the club in November 2011, signing a three-year contract with Hammarby. He left Hammarby in November 2014, after a three-year stint at the Stockholm based club.

Theorin previously played for FC Lyn Oslo in the Norwegian Premier League and Malmö FF whom he left in June 2008.

References

1983 births
Living people
Swedish footballers
Gefle IF players
Malmö FF players
Lyn Fotball players
Hammarby Fotboll players
IK Frej players
Landskrona BoIS players
Swedish expatriate footballers
Allsvenskan players
Eliteserien players
Expatriate footballers in Norway
Association football defenders
People from Härnösand
Sportspeople from Västernorrland County